Playing on the Rainbow (Swedish: Lek på regnbågen) is a 1958 Swedish drama film directed by Lars-Eric Kjellgren and starring Mai Zetterling,  Alf Kjellin and Birger Malmsten. It was shot at the Råsunda Studios in Stockholm. The film's sets were designed by the art director P.A. Lundgren.

Cast
 Mai Zetterling as 	Vanja Ringqvist
 Alf Kjellin as 	Björn Rådström
 Birger Malmsten as 	Hasse Eriksson
 Gunlög Hagberg as 	Barbro Axelsson
 Isa Quensel as 	Björn's Mother
 Claes Thelander as Hannes Holmén
 Else-Marie Brandt as 	Björn's mistress
 Märta Dorff as Marriage officiate
 Lars Egge as 	Judge
 Inga Landgré as 	Red-headed woman
 Bo Samuelsson as 	Sven-Erik
 Gunnar Sjöberg as 	Prosecutor
 Tor Borong a s	Man drinking beer 
 Hans Dahlberg as 	Guest 
 Björn Gustafson as Student 
 Nils Jacobsson as 	Shop-assistant 
 John Norrman as 	Sailor in need of help 
 Bellan Roos as 	Telephone operator 
 Håkan Serner as 	The chairman of the film studio 
 Kerstin Widgren as Student

References

Bibliography 
 Qvist, Per Olov & von Bagh, Peter. Guide to the Cinema of Sweden and Finland. Greenwood Publishing Group, 2000.

External links 
 

1958 films
Swedish drama films
1958 drama films
1950s Swedish-language films
Films directed by Lars-Eric Kjellgren
Swedish black-and-white films
1950s Swedish films